Carinacaris is an extinct genus of penaeid shrimps in the family Penaeidae. There is one described species in Carinacaris, C. teruzzii.

References

Penaeidae
Articles created by Qbugbot